Inella can refer to:

 Inella, a genus of gastropod molluscs in the family Triphoridae.
 Inella (trilobite), a genus of trilobites